Mirza Aqa Khan Nuri, otherwise known as Aqa Khan Nuri ('Nouri'), E'temad-ol Dowleh (born 1807 – died 1865) was a politician in Qajar Iran, who served as prime minister (Persian: , "ṣadr-e aʿẓam") between 1851–58 during the reign of King Naser al-Din Shah Qajar ( 1848–96). He was prominent member of the Khajeh Nouri family.

Biography
Aqa Khan-e Nuri was born as the second son of Mīrzā Asad-Allāh Nūrī, who served as the chief army accountant (laškarnevīs-bāšī) during the reign of two subsequent Qajar kings; Agha Mohammad Khan Qajar and Fath Ali Shah Qajar. Their family, known as the Nuri family, were part of the local nobility of the Nur region in Mazandaran, and were prominently visible both in the bureaucracy of the state as well as the army since the mid-18th century. He died in Qom on 10 March 1865, being "possibly a victim of foul play organized by his enemies".

His origin can be traced to the Khajenouri family, an old Persian family of nobility.

References

Sources

 

1807 births
1865 deaths
Prime Ministers of Iran
19th-century Iranian politicians
People from Nur, Iran
People of Qajar Iran